Holiness in Judaism, often referred to by the Hebrew word for holiness, Kedushah, is frequently used in Judaism to describe God; worldly places and items that have holy status, such as a Torah, other Torah literature, and Jewish ritual objects such as a menorah, tzitzit, tefillin, or mikveh; special days of the year; and people who are considered on a high spiritual level (a tzadik or a gadol).

Literal translation 

The Torah describes the Aaronite priests and the Levites as being selected by God to perform the Temple services; they, as well, are called "holy."

Instances of holiness

Place 

Holiness is not a single state, but contains a broad spectrum. The Mishnah lists concentric circles of holiness surrounding the Temple in Jerusalem: Holy of Holies, Temple Sanctuary, Temple Vestibule, Court of Priests, Court of Israelites, Court of Women, Temple Mount, the walled city of Jerusalem, all the walled cities of Israel, and the borders of the Land of Israel. Distinctions are made as to who and what are permitted in each area.

Time 
Likewise, the Jewish holidays and the Shabbat are considered to be holy in time; the Torah calls them "holy [days of] gathering". Work is not allowed on those days, and rabbinic tradition lists 39 categories of activity that are specifically prohibited.

Object or person
Beyond the intrinsically holy, objects can become sacred through consecration. Any personal possession may be dedicated to the Temple of God, after which its misappropriation is considered among the gravest of sins. The various sacrifices are holy. Those that may be eaten have very specific rules concerning who may eat which of their parts, and time limits on when the consumption must be completed. Most sacrifices contain a part to be consumed by the priests – a portion of the holy to be consumed by God's holy devotees.

General understanding 

The encounter with the holy is seen as eminently desirable, and at the same time fearful and awesome. For the strongest penalties are applied to one who transgresses in this area – one could in theory receive either the death penalty or the heavenly punishment of kareth, spiritual excision, for mis-stepping in his close approach to God's domain.

Jewish kabbalistic tradition expresses holiness as possible perception of the soul, above all united to the body: hence the repeated allusion to the involvement of the supernal worlds in relation to the world of Assiah, so-called "material world". "Sanctify yourselves and be holy, for I am God your Lord": Sanctify yourselves— these are the "first waters" And be holy— these are the "last waters". "Sanctify yourselves" means to take the initiative and work to become holy. Afterwards, "be holy"— strengthen yourself to maintain your level of holiness.

See also 
 Happiness in Judaism
 Anger in Judaism
 Heaven in Judaism
 Bereavement in Judaism
 Kiddush Hashem

References 

Jewish philosophy
Holiness
Jewish belief and doctrine
Jewish law and rituals
God in Judaism